Harmeet Singh Kalka (born 23 August 1968) is an Indian politician and was a member of the Shiromani Akali Dal. Kalka was a member of the Delhi Legislative Assembly from the Kalkaji constituency of the South Delhi.

He is currently serving as President of Delhi Sikh Gurdwara Management Committee.

References 

People from New Delhi
Bharatiya Janata Party politicians from Delhi
Members of the Delhi Legislative Assembly
Living people
21st-century Indian politicians
1968 births